Saint-Ours is a city located in the Pierre-De Saurel Regional County Municipality of Québec (Canada), in the administrative region of Montérégie. The population as of the Canada 2011 Census was 1,721. Founded in 1650 and originally constituent of the Saint-Ours Parish Municipality, which merged alongside L'Immaculée-Conception-de-Saint-Ours municipality in 1991, Saint-Ours is one of the earliest settlements in Montérégie.

Demographics 

Population trend:

Mother tongue language (2006)

See also
List of cities in Quebec

References

Cities and towns in Quebec
Incorporated places in Pierre-De Saurel Regional County Municipality
Designated places in Quebec